Teall may refer to:

People
 Alfred Teall
 Billy Teall (1914–?), English rugby league football player
 Francis A. Teall (1822–1894), American editor
 Jethro Teall (1849–1924), British geologist and petrographist

Places
 Cape Teall
 Teall Island
 Teall Nunatak